Cecil L. Collins (April 21, 1926 – September 30, 2007) was the former Mayor of North Augusta, South Carolina, U.S., from 1967 to 1971 and a member of the South Carolina House of Representatives from 1972 to 1977.  He was born and raised in Fort Valley, Georgia, U.S.,  and served in the Naval Air Corps during World War II.  He attended the University of Georgia and graduated in 1950 with a degree in agronomy.  Collins opened up the first wholesale florist in Augusta, Georgia, U.S., in 1954, which is still being run by three of his sons (Georgia State Floral Distributors).  His civic activities included the Optimist Club, Dixie Youth Baseball, American Legion Post 71, Grace United Methodist Church, The University of Georgia Heritage Society, as well as co-chairing the North Augusta High School Stadium fund raising committee.  He was awarded the highest honor given by the state of South Carolina, the Order of the Palmetto, for his dedication and leadership to his constituents.  In addition to his political and civic work, Collins permanently endowed a fund at the University of Georgia within the Department of Horticulture.

References
 Augusta Chronicle, October 3, 2007
 Aiken Standard, October 3, 2007
 UGA Gift & Estate Planning|Professional Advisory Reference, 4/22/2006

1926 births
2007 deaths
People from Fort Valley, Georgia
Mayors of places in South Carolina
Members of the South Carolina House of Representatives
20th-century American politicians
People from North Augusta, South Carolina
United States Navy personnel of World War II
University of Georgia alumni